The Delirium World Tour was the third headlining concert tour by English singer and songwriter Ellie Goulding to promote her third studio album, Delirium (2015). The tour consists of four legs, European, North American, summer festivals and Oceanic. Including 89 dates across 88 cities, the tour commenced on 21 January 2016 at Barclaycard Arena in Hamburg, Germany, and concluded on 12 May 2017 at OLM Souissi in Rabat, Morocco, as a part of the Mawazine Festival.

Opening acts
 John Newman 
 Sara Hartman 
 Years & Years 
 The Knocks 
 Broods 
 Cedric Gervais 
 Bebe Rexha 
 Matt and Kim 
 Asta 
 Openside 
 LANY

Setlists
{{hidden
| headercss = background: #CECEF2; font-size: 100%; width: 75%;
| contentcss = text-align: left; font-size: 100%; width: 95%;
| header = Europe and United Kingdom
| content =

"Intro (Delirium)"
"Aftertaste"
"Holding on for Life"
"Goodness Gracious"
"We Can't Move to This"
"Outside"
"Devotion" 
"I Do What I Love" 
"Keep on Dancin'"
"Don't Need Nobody "
"Heal" 
"Explosions"
"Army"
"Lights" 
"Lost and Found" 
"Lost & Found / Figure 8" 
"Figure 8"
"On My Mind"
"Codes"
"Don't Panic"
"Something in the Way You Move"
"I Need Your Love"
"Burn
Encore:
"Anything Could Happen"
"Love Me like You Do"
}}
{{hidden
| headercss = background: #CECEF2; font-size: 100%; width: 75%;
| contentcss = text-align: left; font-size: 100%; width: 95%;
| header = North America 
| content =

"Intro (Delirium)"
"Aftertaste"
"Holding on for Life
"Goodness Gracious"
"Something in the Way You Move"
"Outside"
"Devotion" 
"I Do What I Love" 
"Keep on Dancin"
"Don't Need Nobody"
"Heal" 
"Explosions"
"When Doves Cry" 
"Lights" 
"Army"
"Lost & Found" 
"Lost & Found / Figure 8" 
"Figure 8"
"On My Mind"
"Codes"
"We Can't Move To This"
"I Need Your Love"
"Burn"
Encore:
"Anything Could Happen"
"Love Me like You Do"
}}

{{hidden
| headercss = background: #CECEF2; font-size: 100%; width: 75%;
| contentcss = text-align: left; font-size: 100%; width: 95%;
| header =  EXIT, Belsonic, and Rock Werchter Festival's
| content =
"Intro (Delirium)"
"Aftertaste"
"Holding on for Life"
"Goodness Gracious"
"Something in the Way You Move" 
"Outside"
"Devotion" 
"I Do What I Love" 
"Keep on Dancin''
"Don't Need Nobody "
"Lights"
"Army"
"Figure 8"
"On My Mind"
"Codes"
"Don't Panic"
"I Need Your Love"
"Burn"
"Anything Could Happen"
"Love Me like You Do"
}}
{{hidden
| headercss = background: #CECEF2; font-size: 100%; width: 75%;
| contentcss = text-align: left; font-size: 100%; width: 95%;
| header =   Main Square Festival
| content =
"Intro (Delirium)"
"Aftertaste"
"Holding on for Life"
"Goodness Gracious"
"Something in the Way You Move"
"Outside"
"Burn"
"Lights"
"Army"
<li value="10">"On My Mind"
<li value="11">"Anything Could Happen"
<li value="12">"I Need Your Love"
<li value="13">"Love Me like You Do"
}}

Shows

Cancelled shows

Tour credits

References

2016 concert tours
2017 concert tours
Concert tours of Canada
Concert tours of France
Concert tours of Germany
Concert tours of the United Kingdom
Concert tours of the United States
Ellie Goulding